Ángel Tomás Cordero Jr. (born: November 8, 1942) is one of the leading thoroughbred horse racing jockeys of the late 20th-century and the first Puerto Rican to be inducted into the United States' Racing Hall of Fame.  He led all jockeys in wins at Saratoga Race Course for thirteen years.  Cordero rode three Kentucky Derby winners and won over 6000 races in his career.

Early years

Cordero was born in Santurce, Puerto Rico where he began racing at a young age. His father, Ángel Cordero Sr., was a rider and throughbred trainer. His grandfather and uncles were also riders and horse trainers. His hometown in America is Long Island, NY.

American Classic Races
Cordero was the first Puerto Rican jockey to win all three of the American Classic Races, the Kentucky Derby, Preakness Stakes, and Belmont Stakes, though not all in the same year.

In 1974, when he was 31, Cordero won the Kentucky Derby aboard Cannonade. He won the Derby twice more, making him one of only eight jockeys to win the race three or more times in the Derby's history.  In 1976, he won on Bold Forbes and in 1985, on Spend A Buck. In 1976, Cordero won the Belmont Stakes on Bold Forbes, and he won the Preakness Stakes twice, once in 1980 aboard Codex (his winning status was not overturned despite widely-publicized accusations of illegal block-maneuvering and face-lashing of opponent-filly Genuine Risk with his whip) and the second time in 1984, aboard Gate Dancer.

Among his other accomplishments, Cordero was the winner of four Breeders' Cup races and was the leading rider at Saratoga Race Course for thirteen years.  In 1987, Cordero became the fourth jockey to win over 6,000 races.

In 1992, Cordero's career was cut short after a fall which nearly cost him his life. His spleen was removed due to the accident that occurred at Aqueduct.  However, against the wishes of his family and friends, in 1995, Cordero saddled up again to ride the Breeders' Cup once more.

Later years
Cordero has now retired from riding, but continues to be involved in the sport full-time.  He was the agent of fellow Puerto Rican horse jockey, John Velazquez. Cordero's wife, Marjorie Clayton Cordero, who was also a well-known figure in New York's thoroughbred racing, died on January 22, 2001. Cordero is the father of five children. 

Cordero was inducted into National Museum of Racing and Hall of Fame in 1988 and in 2001, he was inducted into the Nassau County Sports Hall of Fame.  In 2010 he was inducted into the African-American Ethnic Sports Hall of Fame.

In an interview in December 2021, Cordero spoke about his life-long friendship with Major League Baseball Hall of Famer Orlando Cepeda, who he considers his brother.

In 2021, Cordero was based in New York full-time and working with Manuel Franco, a Puerto Rican jockey.

See also

 List of Puerto Ricans

References

 Angel Cordero Jr.'s profile at the United States' National Museum and Racing Hall of Fame

United States Thoroughbred Racing Hall of Fame inductees
Puerto Rican jockeys
American Champion jockeys
Eclipse Award winners
People from Santurce, Puerto Rico
Sportspeople from San Juan, Puerto Rico
1942 births
Living people